Ambroise Ngoya (born 2 March 1964) is a Congolese footballer. He played in one match for the Congo national football team in 1993. He was also named in Congo's squad for the 1992 African Cup of Nations tournament.

References

1964 births
Living people
Republic of the Congo footballers
Republic of the Congo international footballers
1992 African Cup of Nations players
Place of birth missing (living people)
Association football goalkeepers